The Apache Canyon Railroad Bridge, located in Santa Fe County, New Mexico near Lamy, New Mexico, is a deck plate girder bridge built in 1892. It was listed on the National Register of Historic Places in 1979. 

References

Bridges in New Mexico
National Register of Historic Places in Santa Fe County, New Mexico
Buildings and structures completed in 1892